The Zeya Dam is a concrete gravity dam on the Zeya River by the town of Zeya, Amur Oblast, Russia, north of the Chinese border.  On average the Zeya Hydroelectric Power Station generates 4.91 TWh of electricity per year.  It is equipped with 6 hydro-turbines, 4 with capacity of 225 MW and 2 with capacity of 215 MW.

The Zeya Reservoir is located in the upper course of the Zeya, below the southern foothills of the Toko-Stanovik, a subrange of the Stanovoy, to the north of the Tukuringra Range and Dzhagdy Range junction. A narrow,  valley separates the dam water body from the vast surface of the reservoir. The Baikal-Amur Mainline railway runs along the north shore, where a  bridge has been constructed.

Settlements on the shore of Zeya Dam include Beregovoy, Khvoyny, Gorny, Verknezeysk, Bomnak and Snezhnogorsk.

See also

List of conventional hydroelectric power stations
List of power stations in Russia

References

External links
Официальный сайт филиала Зейская ГЭС ОАО «РусГидро»
Официальный сайт ОАО «РусГидро»
Описание Зейской ГЭС на сайте института Ленгидропроект
Описание плотины Зейской ГЭС

Hydroelectric power stations built in the Soviet Union
Hydroelectric power stations in Russia
Energy in the Russian Far East
Buildings and structures in Amur Oblast
Dams completed in 1975
Cultural heritage monuments in Amur Oblast
Objects of cultural heritage of Russia of regional significance